Lex Records is a British independent record label based in Camden, London, England.

Style
Lex has a varied musical output. Most releases are alternative hip hop, alternative rock or electronic. The label works with a small group of artists. Due to the small roster, Lex has a low volume of releases, rarely releasing more than three albums annually.

Dazed described Lex as a label "...whose wildly creative output spans over a decade of landmark releases that have changed the music industry no end."

Many Lex albums are collaborations between members of the label roster. The collaborative groups include Danger Mouse with MF Doom as Danger Doom, Boom Bip with Gruff Rhys as Neon Neon, Jneiro Jarel with MF Doom as JJ Doom, Fly Anakin with Pink Siifu and Eyedress with Zzzahara as The Simps.
  
Lex packaging is often striking with elaborate print. Much of the Lex sleeve artwork up to 2011 was created by Ehquestionmark. Other sleeve artwork has been created by Braindead, ESPO, David Lynch, Kid Acne, James Jarvis, Yu Sato, Eric Hu and Commission Studio.

History

2001–2011 
Lex Records was founded by Tom Brown in 2001. It was originally an imprint of Warp Records and run from its North London offices. The label was initially intended only to release 12-inch singles. However, as Lex approached artists to contribute music, most artists offered a full album. By the end of 2003, Lex had released several albums including debuts by Boom Bip, Non-Prophets and Danger Mouse. The early success of these albums allowed Lex to expand.

In 2004, Lex managed The Grey Album campaign, co-ordinating the promo on what would become the music story of the year and propel Danger Mouse into the spotlight of mainstream media, establishing him as a critically successful artist. Tom Brown got a copy of The Grey Album to Damon Albarn. Damon's enthusiasm for The Grey Album led directly to Danger Mouse being brought on board to produce Gorillaz's second album Demon Days. Demon Days was released in May 2005 and went on to sell millions of copies worldwide and established Danger Mouse as a commercially successful producer by the summer of 2005.

In September 2005, Tom Brown bought Warp's share of the label and set up in new offices. Lex kept its existing roster including Boom Bip, Danger Mouse and Doseone. The first release after the separation was Danger Doom's first album The Mouse and the Mask. It was Lex's biggest selling release to date. Gnarls Barkley's multi platinum first album St. Elsewhere followed in 2006, released on Warner Music Group with Lex branding.

The growth of the label allowed Lex to sign new artists to the roster. In 2005, Lex signed Doomstarks for the world excluding North America. In 2006, Lex signed multi album deals with MF Doom and Jneiro Jarel.

In March 2008, Gnarls Barkley's second album The Odd Couple was released on Warner Music Group with Lex branding. In the same month, Neon Neon's first album Stainless Style was released, going on to be nominated for the Mercury Prize in 2008. In 2009, Lex released MF Doom's Born Like This, his last solo album and the only Willie Isz album, Georgiavania.

In July 2010, Lex released a two-hour audiobook and score of Alan Moore & Mitch Jenkins' Unearthing. It was narrated in its entirety by Alan Moore and scored live by Crook & Flail. They performed it live at the Old Vic Tunnels. In the same month, Danger Mouse, Sparklehorse & David Lynch's Dark Night of the Soul was released through Parlophone with Lex branding.

In May 2011, Danger Mouse & Daniele Luppi's album Rome featuring Jack White and Norah Jones was released on Parlophone with Lex branding. 

On 5 November 2011, Lex marked its tenth anniversary with a show at The Roundhouse in Camden featuring performances by Ghostface Killah, MF Doom and Jneiro Jarel. Lex also released Complex Volume 1, a compilation album to mark the occasion.

2012–2021 

In August 2012 Lex released JJ Doom's Key to the Kuffs, MF Doom's third successive studio album for the label. Later in 2012 Lex launched Charlie White and Boom Bip's art project Music For Sleeping Children which includes photographic, electronic music and spoken word recordings. Lex also developed its first two short films as part of an ongoing episodic series, written by Alan Moore and directed by Mitch Jenkins were previewed online in November 2012.  

In 2013, Lex released Neon Neon's sophomore album Praxis Makes Perfect. The album was presented live as an immersive theatre performance with National Theatre Wales.

In November 2013, Lex and All Tomorrow's Parties brought MF Doom, BadBadNotGood and Bishop Nehru to the O2 Forum Kentish Town.

MF Doom went on to collaborate with BadBadNotGood and Bishop Nehru on Lex. BadBadNotGood remixed the JJ Doom track "Guv'nor" in 2013. MF Doom produced the Bishop Nehru mini-album NehruvianDoom in 2014. MF Doom appeared on BadBadNotGood & Ghostface Killah's 2015 album Sour Soul.

Eyedress released his first single on Lex in 2016. His debut studio album, Manila Ice, was released on Lex in May 2017, followed by Sensitive G in November 2018.

Lex released singles from Eyedress’ third album Let's Skip to the Wedding, including "Jealous" on 19 December 2019 and “Romantic Lover” on 12 January 2020. “Jealous” and “Romantic Lover” became viral hits after the release of the album. “Jealous” was certified gold in Australia, Canada, Poland and the US in 2021, and 2x platinum in the US in March 2023. "Romantic Lover" was certified platinum in the US in the same month.

Lex's first feature film, The Show, written by Alan Moore and directed by Mitch Jenkins was an official selection for SXSW 2020. Following SXSW's cancellation due to the COVID-19 pandemic film had a world premiere at Sitges Film Festival 2020, and was licensed to Starz.

On 31 December 2020, MF Doom's death was announced on social media.

In August 2021 Lex released Eyedress’ fourth studio album Mulholland Drive. The first single from the album, “Something About You” became a viral hit in the US with Rolling Stone citing the track as the fastest-rising song on American streaming services for the week ending 23 September 2021. "Something About You" was certified gold in the USA in May  2022.

During 2021, Lex marked its twentieth anniversary by releasing a series of remixes of recordings in its catalogue under the project title Lex-XX.

Artists past and present

Awards and certifications
RIAA CERTIFICATION (USA)
Eyedress, "Jealous" - 2x Platinum digital single
Eyedress "Romantic Lover" - Platinum digital single 
Eyedress, "Something About You" - Gold digital single
Gnarls Barkley, St. Elsewhere - Platinum album
Gnarls Barkley, "Crazy" - 4× Platinum digital single
Gnarls Barkley, "Crazy" - Platinum mastertone

A2IM LIBERA AWARDS (USA)
2022, Eyedress, Mulholland Drive - Marketing Genius (finalist)

GRAMMY AWARDS (USA)
2012, Danger Mouse, Rome - Producer of the Year, Non-Classical (nominated)
2011, Danger Mouse, Dark Night of the Soul - Producer of the Year, Non-Classical (won)
2009, Gnarls Barkley, "Going On" - Best Pop Performance by a Duo or Group with Vocals (nominated)
2009, Gnarls Barkley, The Odd Couple - Best Alternative Music Album (nominated)
2009, Danger Mouse, The Odd Couple - Producer of the Year, Non-Classical (nominated)
2009, Gnarls Barkley, "Who's Gonna Save My Soul" - Best Short Form Music Video (nominated)
2008, Gnarls Barkley, "Gone Daddy Gone" - Best Short Form Music Video (nominated)
2007, Danger Mouse, St. Elsewhere - Producer of the Year, Non-Classical (nominated)
2007, Gnarls Barkley, St. Elsewhere - Best Alternative Music Album (won)
2007, Gnarls Barkley, St. Elsewhere - Album of the Year (nominated)
2007, Gnarls Barkley, "Crazy" - Record of the Year (nominated)
2007, Gnarls Barkley, "Crazy" - Best Urban/Alternative Performance (won)
2006, Danger Mouse, The Mouse And The Mask - Producer of the Year, Non-Classical (nominated)

Plug Independent Music Awards (USA)
2006, Danger Doom The Mouse And The Mask - Hip-Hop Album of the Year (won)

Music Canada Certification (Canada)
Eyedress, "Something About You" - Gold single
Eyedress, "Jealous" - Platinum single
Gnarls Barkley, St. Elsewhere - Platinum album
Gnarls Barkley, "Crazy" - Double Platinum ringtone

Juno Music Prize (Canada)
2016, BadBadNotGood & Ghostface Killah Sour Soul - Rap Recording of the Year (nominated)|

Polaris Music Prize (Canada)
2015, BadBadNotGood & Ghostface Killah Sour Soul (shortlisted)

Brit Certified (UK)
Eyedress "Jealous"  - Silver single
Neon Neon, Stainless Style - Bronze / Breakthrough album
Gnarls Barkley, St. Elsewhere - 2× Platinum album
Gnarls Barkley, "Crazy" - 3× Platinum single

Mercury Prize (UK)
2017,  Kae Tempest – Let Them Eat Chaos (shortlisted)
2008, Neon Neon – Stainless Style (shortlisted)

Brit Awards (UK)
2007, Gnarls Barkley – Best International Group (nominated)
2007, Gnarls Barkley – International Breakthrough Act (nominated)
2007, Gnarls Barkley  St. Elsewhere – International Album (nominated)

British Animation Awards (UK)
2006, Director SSSR, Subtle "Swan Meat" video - Best Music Video (won)

See also
 List of record labels
 List of electronic music record labels
 List of independent UK record labels

References

External links
 Official website
 Ehquestionmark

Electronic music record labels
British independent record labels
Record labels established in 2001
Hip hop record labels
Alternative rock record labels